United Bengali Liberation Front was a militant separatist organisation in Tripura, India. It sought to protect Bengalis from Bangladesh against Tripuri militants and other tribal groups and first appeared in the year 1995, alongside the NLFT and ATTF. There was no official data about its commanders and cadres. UBLF was involved in bomb blasts, murders and Hostage Crises.  Its conflict was against Indigenous Tribals and other Tribals of Neighbouring stares . The UBLF came into existence only after the ATTF was formed with the aim of decimating Bengali Hindus living in Tripura. The ATTF carried out multiple attacks against the Bengali Hindus who arrived to India after ethnic cleansing in Bangladesh. The ATTF have been credited with at least 20 attacks on Bengali speaking people. The formation of UBLF was a direct retaliation against these killings of Bengali Hindus.The UBLF was banned by the GoI later.

However the ban on the UBLF is merely symbolic as the outfit had already disbanded once the Indian Government declared the official defeat of the tribal insurgency. With Bengali Rule and domination permanently the UBLF found no reason to exist further.

References

Paramilitary organisations based in India
Organisations designated as terrorist by India